Bishop Neumann Jr./Sr. High School is a parochial Roman Catholic high school located in Wahoo, Nebraska, United States. It is located in the Roman Catholic Diocese of Lincoln.

It is a part of Saunders Catholic Schools.

Athletics
Bishop Neumann is a member of the Nebraska School Activities Association. The school has won the following NSAA State Championships:
 Boys' American football - 1977, 2002, 2003
 Boys' basketball - 1991, 2002, 2003, 2014, 2016, 2017
 Girls' basketball - 2009, 2010, 2019
 Boys' track and field - 1995, 1996, 1997, 2015, 2016
 Boys' cross country - 1997, 1998
 Girls' track and field - 1987, 1988, 2008
 Girls' cross country - 1993, 1994, 1997, 2005
 Girls' softball - 2017, 2021

The American football player Zach Miller, of the Chicago Bears, is a Bishop Neumann alumnus.

References

External links
 Bishop Neumann Jr/Sr High School

Roman Catholic Diocese of Lincoln
Catholic secondary schools in Nebraska
Schools in Saunders County, Nebraska
Educational institutions established in 1964
1964 establishments in Nebraska